The Officers' Organization or the Military Organization of the Tudeh Party, also known as Tudeh Military Network, was an intelligence gathering network that infiltrated the Iranian Armed Forces using clandestine cell system method.

Bibliography

References

External links 

 

1944 establishments in Iran
Spy rings
Rebel groups in Iran
Cold War history of Iran
Affiliated organizations of the Tudeh Party of Iran
Soviet spies
Iran–Soviet Union relations